Norma Santini (born 20 July 1932) is a Venezuelan fencer. She competed in the women's individual and team foil events at the 1960 Summer Olympics.

References

External links
 

1932 births
Living people
Venezuelan female foil fencers
Olympic fencers of Venezuela
Fencers at the 1960 Summer Olympics
People from Valera
Pan American Games medalists in fencing
Pan American Games silver medalists for Venezuela
Fencers at the 1963 Pan American Games
20th-century Venezuelan people
21st-century Venezuelan people